Vive L'Amour is a 1994 Taiwanese New Wave film directed by Tsai Ming-liang. It is Tsai's second feature film and premiered at the 51st Venice International Film Festival, where it won the prestigious Golden Lion. The film is about three people who unknowingly share an apartment in Taipei.

Plot
Hsiao-kang (Lee Kang-sheng), a young salesman, discovers a key to an apartment in its lock and takes it. He soon moves into one of the bedrooms, and one night he attempts to commit suicide by slitting his wrists while lying on the bed.

Meanwhile, Ah-jung (Chen Chao-jung) is drinking coffee at a cafe when a beautiful real estate agent, May Lin (Yang Kuei-mei), sits at the table next to his. Intrigued, he follows her as she walks down the street. Lin catches on and eventually joins him. She leads him to a vacant apartment that she is trying to sell — the same apartment that Hsiao-kang is staying in — and they have sex in one of the bedrooms. Hsiao-kang hears them and stops the bleeding from his wrists.

Ah-jung steals the key to the apartment from Lin and later returns with his belongings. He moves into one of the adjoining bedrooms. That night, he and Hsiao-kang encounter each other in the apartment and have a short argument.

May Lin spends her day trying to sell property. While taking a break, she returns to the apartment when Hsiao-kang and Ah-jung are both there. The two sneak out quietly together and soon form a friendship.

One night, Hsiao-kang goes out for a walk and meets Ah-jung selling dresses on the street. May Lin walks past but does not notice them. Soon, Ah-jung joins her at a food stand and the two return to the apartment and sleep together in the same room as they did the first time. Unbeknownst to them, Hsiao-kang is hiding under the bed as they arrive, and he masturbates as the bed creaks above him.

The next morning, May Lin gets dressed and leaves. Hsiao-kang lies next to the sleeping Ah-jung and kisses him before slowly pulling away. Lin goes to her car but cannot start it, and instead walks on a path in the unfinished Daan Forest Park. She then sits down on a bench and starts to cry uncontrollably.

Cast
 Yang Kuei-mei (楊貴媚) as May Lin, a real estate agent
 Lee Kang-sheng (李康生) as Hsiao-kang, a salesman for a commercial ossuary (納骨塔)
 Chen Chao-jung (陳昭榮) as Ah-jung, a street peddler
 Lu Yi-ching (陸弈靜) as a coffee shop owner

Reception
Vive L'Amour won three Golden Horse Awards, for Best Picture, Best Director, and Best Sound Effects. It also won the Golden Lion award at the 51st Venice International Film Festival.

On AllMovie, reviewer Jonathan Crow praised the film, writing that "[director Tsai Ming-liang] presents Taipei as a soulless, ultra-modern labyrinth where individuals cannot communicate other than in one-night stands or business transactions. The film's style is masterful in both economy and emotional power. With very long takes, little narrative tension, and almost no dialogue, the style reinforces the cold, alienating world in which the characters live."

. In the 2012 Sight & Sound polls it received two critics' votes and three directors' votes.

References

External links
 
 

1994 films
1994 drama films
1994 LGBT-related films
Taiwanese drama films
Taiwanese LGBT-related films
1990s Mandarin-language films
Golden Lion winners
Films whose director won the Best Director Golden Horse Award
Films about homelessness
Films directed by Tsai Ming-liang
Films with screenplays by Tsai Ming-liang
Central Motion Picture Corporation films